Beynaq or Beynoq or Binaq may refer to:
 Binaq, East Azerbaijan
 Beynaq, Razavi Khorasan